The 1981–82 John Player Cup was the 11th edition of England's premier rugby union club competition at the time. Gloucester and Moseley shared the title  after  playing out a 12-12 draw in the final. The event was sponsored by John Player cigarettes and the final was held at Twickenham Stadium.

Draw and results

First round

Second round

Away team progress*

Third round

Fourth round

Quarter-finals

Semi-finals

Final

References

1981–82 rugby union tournaments for clubs
John Player Cup
RFU Knockout Cup